Ekaterina Vladimirovna Birlova (born 11 August 1987 in Bryansk),  Khomyakova, is a Russian beach volleyball player. As of 2012, she plays with Evgenia Ukolova. They qualified for the 2012 Summer Olympics in London and for the 2016 Summer Olympics in Rio de Janeiro.

References

External links
 
 
 
 

1987 births
Living people
Russian beach volleyball players
Beach volleyball players at the 2012 Summer Olympics
Beach volleyball players at the 2016 Summer Olympics
Olympic beach volleyball players of Russia
Universiade medalists in beach volleyball
Universiade gold medalists for Russia
Sportspeople from Bryansk